Mohamad Raphi Bin Azizan Mariappen (born 28 January 1996) is a Malaysian professional footballer who plays as a defender for Malaysian club KSR Sains.

Club career

Petaling Jaya Rangers
On 5 May 2017, Raphi  signed a contract with Petaling Jaya Rangers.

Career statistics
As of 29 July 2018

Honours
Malaysia Premier League
Runners-up(1) : 2015

References

Malaysian footballers
1996 births
Living people
Petaling Jaya Rangers F.C. players
People from Kedah
Association football defenders